Christ's Church, Jinan is a Protestant church located in Huaiyin District, Jinan, Shandong, China.

History 
In the early 20th century, Liu Shoushan, a real estate developer and believer in Qingdao, Shandong, initiated the establishment of the Shangdong Chinese Independent Christian Church. In 1913, he purchased land in Jinan Commercial Port to establish a chapel, which was completed in 1915. An extension of the church, designed by Li Honggen, commenced in 1924 and was completed in 1926.

In October 2013, it was inscribed as a provincial cultural relic preservation organ by the Shandong government.

References

Further reading 
 

Churches in Shandong
1926 establishments in China
Churches completed in 1926
Tourist attractions in Jinan
Protestant churches in China